The Arrowhead State Trail is a recreational trail in the Arrowhead Region of northern Minnesota, USA, geared primarily for winter snowmobile use.

The Arrowhead State Trail was authorized by the Minnesota Legislature in 1974–75.  It is managed by the Minnesota Department of Natural Resources.

Description
The northern section of the trail from International Falls to the Ash River is fairly flat, passing through forests of aspen on higher ground and spruce and ash on lower ground.  The southern section is more rugged, featuring rolling hills with large, exposed boulders interspersed with many lakes and streams.  This thickly wooded area is part of the Laurentian Mixed Forest Province.  There are intersections with numerous local snowmobile trails.  The route of the Arrowhead State Trail passes within  of Voyageurs National Park and within  of the Boundary Waters Canoe Area Wilderness.  The trail, which very roughly follows U.S. Route 53, offers nine shelters with firepits and restrooms.

Events
Since 2005 the trail has hosted the Arrowhead 135, a  extreme endurance race in which contestants are challenged to carry all of their own gear under their own power via foot, ski, or bicycle, in mid-winter.

References

External links
 Arrowhead State Trail
 Snowshoe racing on Arrowhead Trail

Protected areas of Koochiching County, Minnesota
Minnesota state trails
Protected areas of St. Louis County, Minnesota